Noah's wife is nameless in the Bible (Genesis 4:22; Gen. 7:7). According to F. L. Utley, apocryphal literature lists 103 variations of her name and personality.

The most popular candidate is Naamah, the daughter of Lamech.

In Mandaeism
Mandaean literature, of uncertain antiquity, refers to Noah's (or Shem's) wife by the name Nuraita (or Nhuraitha, Anhuraita, among various other spellings). There is some contradiction between texts, and some textual ambiguity, regarding which patriarch is married to Nuraita; additionally, Anhuraita appears to be a portmanteau of Nuraita and Anhar, the wives of Noah and Shem.

See also
 Wives aboard Noah's Ark

References

Bibliography
 
 
 
 

Women in the Bible
Noah